Evanescence is an American rock band founded in Little Rock, Arkansas in 1995 by singer and musician Amy Lee and guitarist Ben Moody. After recording independent EPs as a duo in the late 1990s, and a demo CD, Evanescence released their debut studio album, Fallen, on Wind-up Records in 2003. Propelled by the success of hit singles like "Bring Me to Life" and "My Immortal", Fallen sold more than four million copies in the US by January 2004, garnering the band two Grammy Awards out of six nominations. The band released their first live album and concert DVD, Anywhere but Home, in 2004, which sold over one million copies worldwide.

Evanescence released their second studio album, The Open Door, in 2006, co-composed by Lee and guitarist Terry Balsamo. It sold more than six million copies worldwide, and received a Grammy nomination. They reconvened in June 2009 to work on music for their next album, with touring guitarist Troy McLawhorn, bassist Tim McCord and drummer Will Hunt becoming full-time members. The band's third studio album, Evanescence, was released in 2011. It debuted at the top of the Billboard 200 as well as the Billboard Rock Albums, Digital Albums, Alternative Albums, and Hard Rock Albums charts. Following the end of the album's tour cycle, the band entered a hiatus.

In 2014, Lee and Evanescence left their record label and became independent artists. The band emerged from hiatus in 2015 and resumed touring, while new music was not yet created as Lee was also focusing on a solo project. In late 2016, Lee stated that Evanescence was working on a fourth album, Synthesis (2017), composed of orchestral and electronica arrangements of the band's previous material with two new songs. The album's release was followed by the Synthesis Live concert tour, during which the band performed with a live orchestra for the first time. In 2021, Evanescence released their fifth studio album, The Bitter Truth.

Generally classified as a gothic alternative metal and hard rock band, Evanescence have a diverse sound containing various musical styles including classical music, alternative music, heavy metal, symphonic rock, industrial music, nu metal, and electronica, driven by Lee's contrasting musical pursuits and introspective songwriting. Evanescence's lineup changed several times over the years, with Lee as the sole constant member since its inception. The band comprises Lee, guitarist Tim McCord since 2006, guitarist Troy McLawhorn and drummer Will Hunt since 2007, and bassist Emma Anzai on tour as of 2022. Among other accolades, Evanescence has received two Grammy Awards, three Loudwire Music Awards, a Kerrang! Award, a Revolver Golden Gods Music Award, a Brit Award nomination, three American Music Award nominations, and five MTV Video Music Award nominations.

History

1995–2000: Formation and early years
Evanescence was founded in 1995 by singer, pianist and songwriter Amy Lee and guitarist and songwriter Ben Moody in Little Rock, Arkansas. They met in 1994, when Lee was 13 and Moody 14, at a Christian youth camp, where Lee played piano during sport activities and Moody played acoustic guitar and she thought they could play music together. Lee thinks what drew them together at the time was that they "didn't fit in that well" and were "out of [their] element in this silly camp environment". Lee brought Moody a cassette tape of her playing guitar and singing a song she wrote. They became musical collaborators, playing and working on music at Lee's home, and were soon performing acoustic sets at book stores and coffee houses in the Little Rock area. Lee said their music at the time "sounded different because we didn't have the means to make it sound like we wanted". Strings, choirs, and "dramatic, cinematic" sounds were musical desires they couldn't materialize as they were "just two kids in a basement". Lee had a 16-track recorder and she and Moody would use it and Pro Tools, "fake strings and choirs" on her keyboard, and layer sounds and beats for their early material, which they mixed and produced. "We were basically just putting it down to remember what we wanted", Lee said.

What made Lee want to start a band was "the idea of combinations that were unlikely". With Evanescence, Lee aimed to combine her different musical tastes, "bringing something from the cinematic and classical symphonic world and marrying it to metal, hard rock and alternative music." "There was all this music that was inspiring me. And Evanescence was the product of these two extremes combining". After experimenting with band names, such as Childish Intentions and Stricken, Lee and Moody decided on Evanescence, which means "disappearance" or "fading away". They wanted a name that was "out of nowhere", and when they came across the word they found it "beautiful" and "elusive".

They recorded three EPs: Evanescence EP (1998), of which about 100 copies were made and distributed at their early live performances; Sound Asleep EP (1999), also known as the Whisper EP; and Mystary EP (2003). Their early demos got them airplay on the local modern rock station in Little Rock, which helped them develop a local fanbase, allowing them to play a couple of bigger production shows a year and hire other musicians to perform other instruments live. Although they played with guest musicians, Evanescence remained a duo. "It was more because that's what we did and how we worked rather than not wanting any other input", Lee recalled; "The idea of a full band playing these songs was something that only came along later." Moody said that at the time Lee and him were focused on writing music over playing live shows, and they did not want to have a band join their writing process; "we just wanted it to be the two of us and so we'd play once or twice a year."

In 2000, they recorded a full-length demo CD called Origin (2000), which they self-released and sold at local shows. Origin and the earlier EPs contain demo versions of some of the songs that would later appear on their debut album. In a February 2003 radio interview, Lee and Moody encouraged fans to download their older demo songs from the Internet, rather than purchase them from online sources such as eBay where the material had been selling for over US$250.

2001–2004: Fallen and Anywhere but Home

The band members were having their demos mastered at Ardent Studios in Memphis, where a producer heard their music and played their demos to his friend at Wind-up Records, head of A&R Diana Meltzer. Meltzer said what made her want to sign the band was Lee's voice, lyrics and their gothic sound. When she heard "My Immortal" she said she "knew it was a hit". Evanescence was signed by Wind-up in 2001. The label flew the band members to New York, and told them they loved their different sound and thought they had potential, but "we don't really totally know what to do with you", Lee recalled. They were then told, "if you were this good while distracted by school and all this other stuff, how good will you be if we put you in an environment where you have nothing to do but write and be influenced by your surroundings, like in Los Angeles." The band was then relocated to Los Angeles, given an apartment and rehearsal space and enrolled in a gym, according to Meltzer, and Lee, who was very introverted, received help from an acting teacher to overcome her stage fright. Meltzer told HitQuarters in 2003 that, while she loved Lee's voice, their gothic sound, and Lee and Moody had already exhibited "huge talent" with their prior demo material, they were still young and she felt they could benefit from more time to work on their debut album so they "could deliver a breakthrough sound".

Lee said that at the time of signing, they didn't realize the label would move them out to Los Angeles for two years, thinking it would be about six months. The length of time in Los Angeles "really frustrated" them. It ended up being a fruitful writing experience, she said, as they wrote half of the album there and were able to make use of other equipment to get sounds they wanted. After almost two years of the band working on their album, producer Dave Fortman was brought in to produce it. Then, label executives refused to release the album unless the band agreed to hire a full-time male co-vocalist. When they did not agree, the label said they were withdrawing their funding and releasing them from their contract. The band left Los Angeles and drove back to Little Rock.

A few weeks later, the label relented, informing them that they would release their album if they agreed to have a male rapper on its lead single, "Bring Me to Life", in order to give something familiar to listeners. Lee was not happy about this, but reluctantly agreed to the compromise and wrote the part for the male vocal. Lee originally wanted the lead single to be "Going Under" as she was concerned that the public would hear "Bring Me to Life" with its male vocal and decide that was the sound of the band. She was relieved that people were still receptive to Evanescence when "Going Under" was released as their second single. Lee prefers "Bring Me To Life" without the label-forced rap, and expressed dissatisfaction that it "stamps a time period" on the song; she however made peace with it because they were able to "survive past it" and "people were able to, for the most part, understand who we are without us getting stuck in that place."

"Bring Me to Life", featuring guest vocals from Paul McCoy of 12 Stones, and "My Immortal" were originally featured on the soundtrack of the 2003 action film Daredevil, released in February 2003. Evanescence's debut album Fallen was released on March 4, 2003.

Evanescence's music was initially promoted by their label in the Christian market. Lee and Moody publicly made it clear in an April 2003 interview that they were not a Christian band and did not want to be associated with Christian rock. Moody's comments against being in the Christian market immediately prompted Wind-up Records chairman Alan Meltzer to send a letter to Christian radio and retail outlets explaining that despite the "spiritual underpinning that ignited interest and excitement in the Christian religious community", Evanescence were "a secular band, and as such view their music as entertainment" and the label then "strongly feels that they no longer belong in Christian retail outlets". Wind-up formally requested the recall of Fallen from Christian retailers and radio stations. After receiving the letter, many Christian radio stations pulled Fallen songs from their playlists.

Rolling Stone stated in April 2003 that while Wind-up had no official Christian affiliation, they had been marketing their bands "to both the Christian and mainstream music market". Wind-Up "began courting the Christian music market more than a year ago, making its first foray with 12 Stones' self-titled 2002 debut. Hooking up with powerhouse Christian music distributor Provident ... Wind-Up attempted to tap into a segment that generated sales of more than 50 million albums in 2002". Terry Hemmings, CEO of Provident, said that the decision to recall Evanescence's album likely would not hurt Wind-up's image in the Christian market, and that he was puzzled by the band's about-face, saying: "They clearly understood the album would be sold in these  channels." Meltzer claimed their decision to promote Evanescence in the Christian market was made with the band's consent. Lee said that she had always opposed the promotion in the Christian market and the "Christian band" identification from the beginning, while Moody had supported it. Moody had misrepresented Evanescence in the past, talking about his religious beliefs as Evanescence's. The label wanted to use the Christian market promotion as a marketing tool for the band, which she had opposed, stating that "it was an important fight to me because it felt false. That wasn't really what our music was. And I felt like they were selling somebody something that wasn't true." She noted that Evanescence "has never been a Christian band" and lyrically never had a religious affiliation.

On April 7, 2003, Wind-Up released "Bring Me to Life" as the album's lead single. Wind-up president Ed Vetri revealed that when the label had introduced the song to radio, radio programmers rejected it, saying, "A chick and a piano? Are you kidding? On rock radio?" However, after the song was released on the Daredevil soundtrack, a grassroots fanbase grew and listeners began requesting air play for it, compelling radio stations to reconsider the band. The song became a global hit for the band and reached number five on the American Billboard Hot 100. It topped the UK singles chart, where it peaked for four weeks from June–July 2003.

Most of Lee's writing on Fallen was inspired by an abusive relationship she was in. Lee and Moody had composed some of the songs on Fallen when they were 15 and 16. Lee later stated that the creation of the album largely consisted of her and Moody writing music separately and then adding to each other's work, due to tension and significant creative differences between them. After the album's completion, the touring lineup was hired: guitarist John LeCompt, drummer Rocky Gray, and bassist Will Boyd.

Evanescence performed on radio shows and on the festival circuit for weeks in early 2003. They embarked on their first headlining tour from April to May in the US. In June 2003, they had to cancel shows in Germany due to Moody reportedly falling ill. That month, Evanescence accepted an offer from the video game company Nintendo to perform on the Nintendo Fusion Tour, which they headlined beginning on August 4, 2003. The album's second single "Going Under" was released on August 18, 2003; it peaked at number five on the US Modern Rock Tracks, 24 on the Active Rock chart, and number eight on the UK singles chart. In an August 2003 interview, Moody said that Evanescence is "just Amy and I, and I want to keep it that way", adding that their process together is what works.

On October 22, 2003, Moody left the band during the European tour for Fallen, reportedly because of creative differences. Moody had called their management and informed them he was quitting. Lee got a call from their manager asking her to "beg [Moody] to stay", to which she said "that's exactly what he wants me to do" and expressed that if Moody was going to leave, the band "would appreciate it if he'd wait until the end of the tour. But if he can't, then go ahead and go." In an interview, Lee said, "we'd gotten to a point that if something didn't change, we wouldn't have been able to make a second record." She said that by that point Moody "hated the band, he hated being on tour and his negativity made everyone around him miserable. He was trying to pull the whole ship down with him" and she would not let that happen. His exit was a relief because of tensions created within the band, which was at a "breaking point". "It was a really uncomfortable situation for everybody ... completely unstable and unhappy", she explained. "It was a scary time before he left because I knew something was going to happen and I didn't know what and I was afraid everything we worked for had the potential of going down the toilet."

In Lee's termination letter to their manager, she stated that Moody was physically and verbally abusive to her. With Moody gone, "we felt like a weight had been lifted", she said. Touring guitarist John LeCompt said in a 2006 interview that Lee "gained authority as soon as Ben Moody walked out the door. They had an equal partnership, but he was the man, he had to strangle the band, all the life out of it". Lee said that she and Moody had not been friends since their teenage years, and they had pretended to be friends after Fallens release when they were really only business partners. In 2004, Lee confirmed that there were complications for months following Moody's departure "with the legalities of everything - whether we would be legally allowed to continue under the same name". "A lot of things were held up internally that I wasn't allowed to talk about, and I was worried, because it was very important to me to be able to stand up and say, 'No. One person leaving in the middle of a tour and trying to hurt us isn't going to make us lose the entire band.'"

Lee's creative disagreements with Moody included his strict approach to songwriting and focus on commerciality; he would "always be corralling" her ideas, and wanting to push the band in a more commercial, pop direction and she did not. "It was always a push and pull between us, for me", she said. "It's cool because Fallen really is a lot of compromise. It definitely leaned toward what he wanted a lot of the time." "A lot of the reason it's been so much fun writing [post-Moody] is that we're not thinking about that. It's like, 'What do we like? What's fun?'", and there is "no pressure of wanting to rule the world", Lee explained. Moody later said that he struggled with substance abuse during his time in Evanescence. In a 2005 interview, he conceded that he and Lee had different approaches for the music, stating, "[Amy] is much more creative than I am ... I am a bit more commercial minded ... she is more educated musically, and she wanted to explore that. ... it was like my way or the highway. We just couldn't meet in the middle, so I was like, "The hell with it."

In August 2010, Moody released a statement on his history with Lee and Evanescence, where he said that he was a different person at the time, his friendship with Lee had deteriorated, and they had conflicting opinions, personalities, and desires with the band. Moody apologized to Lee for comments he made to her in anger. He said he realized the band would end if he stayed and believes he made the right choice. He added, "Evanescence has progressed a great distance from the original sound, and made it clear that they intended to expand much further. Amy is very artistic and never has had a problem thinking outside of the box and defying expectations."

Ex-Cold guitarist Terry Balsamo had replaced Moody on the Fallen tour as lead guitarist, and soon joined Evanescence as the permanent guitarist. The band played several shows with Korn in Europe, with Evanescence originally set to headline however Lee wanted Korn to headline instead. Fallens third single "My Immortal" was released on December 8, 2003, and peaked at number seven on the US Hot 100 and the UK singles chart.

At the 46th Grammy Awards in February 2004, "Bring Me to Life" won the Grammy Award for Best Hard Rock Performance and the band won Best New Artist from five nominations. On May 31, 2004, Fallens fourth and final single "Everybody's Fool" was released, and peaked at number 36 on the US Modern Rock Tracks chart, and number 24 on the UK singles chart. In November, Lee said she had been working on music for the 2005 film The Chronicles of Narnia: The Lion, the Witch and the Wardrobe, and had originally written the Mozart-inspired song "Lacrymosa" as well as "Together Again" for the film. According to Lee, "Lacrymosa" was rejected because of its interpolation and "Together Again" because of its dark sound. The producers of Narnia then said this was news to them and that no Evanescence music had been planned for the soundtrack of the film. 

During the Fallen tour, Lee wrote a song titled "The Last Song I'm Wasting on You", recording it in a bathroom on an analog recording device. It became a B-side on the single "Lithium" from Evanescence's second album. When asked if the track was about former bandmate Moody, Lee said, "If I answer that, then I'm not hiding anything anymore. But I just sort of answered it, didn't I?". She later deemed it "one of those personal, hard moments, when beauty is born out of pain". On November 24, 2004, Evanescence released their first live album and concert DVD titled Anywhere but Home, which includes a concert in Paris, behind-the-scenes footage of the band, three new songs, the band's cover of Korn's "Thoughtless", and Fallens four music videos. The album sold more than a million copies worldwide. 

Fallen spent 43 weeks in the top 10 of the Billboard 200, peaking at number three. It was listed for 104 weeks on the Billboard 200, and it was one of eight albums in the history of the chart to spend at least a year in the top 50. Fallen was also number six on CBS's list of "Top Bestselling Albums of the Last 10 Years". It was certified platinum by Recording Industry Association of America (RIAA) in April 2003 and 4x platinum in January 2004. It has sold more than 17 million worldwide, including 10 million in the US, since its release.

2004–2007: The Open Door

Lee musically collaborated with Balsamo for the composition of Evanescence's second album, The Open Door (2006). They began writing together in March 2004, after finishing the Fallen tour. The album progressed slowly for several reasons, including Lee's desire to maximize the creative process and not rush production, Balsamo's stroke, and turbulence with their former manager. The writing experience for The Open Door was "the best process" Lee ever had because she had "free reign" and could "do whatever I wanted without being judged". In 2006, Lee said that when she listened back to Fallen, she "hear[d] all the vulnerability and the fear and all the childish things in me that are just human." While Lee was drowning in the misery of her experiences in Fallen, she said The Open Door is largely about her acknowledging her issues and deliberating "what do I have to do to work this out." In the record, she is "purging the trials", but overall it comes from a less hopeless place and with a more reflective outlook.

On July 13, 2006, Lee announced that bassist Will Boyd had left the band after the album was completed for "not wanting to do another big tour" and wanting "to be close to his family". In an interview with MTV, Lee announced that Tim McCord, former Revolution Smile guitarist, would switch instruments and play bass for the band.

The Open Doors lead single "Call Me When You're Sober" hit modern rock and alternative rock radio on August 7, 2006. The 13-track album was released in the United States and Canada on October 3, 2006; the United Kingdom on October 2, 2006; and Australia on September 30, 2006. The album sold 447,000 copies in the United States in its first week of sales and earned their first No. 1 ranking on the Billboard 200 album chart. The music video for "Call Me When You're Sober" was shot in Los Angeles and is based on the fairy tale Little Red Riding Hood. The Open Door became available for pre-order on the iTunes Store on August 15, 2006; the music video for "Call Me When You're Sober" was also made available.

The tour for The Open Door began on October 5, 2006 in Toronto, and included locations in Canada, the U.S., and Europe during that year. This first tour continued on January 5, 2007, and included stops in Canada (alongside band Stone Sour), Japan, and Australia (alongside band Shihad), and then returned to the U.S. for a second tour in the spring (alongside bands Chevelle and Finger Eleven). As part of their tour, Evanescence performed on April 15, 2007, on the Argentinian festival Quilmes Rock 07 along with Aerosmith, Velvet Revolver, and other local bands.

On May 4, 2007, guitarist John LeCompt announced that he had been fired from Evanescence, and also stated that drummer Rocky Gray had decided to quit. Former Evanescence player David Hodges commented on LeCompt and Gray's attitude, stating: 

Lee commented on LeCompt and Gray's departure, stating that they had joined as touring members, and when it came to making the second album they were ultimately not compatible with her and Balsamo's musical approach. They disassociated but chose to stay as live players while planning to leave at another time. "When they joined the band, Fallen was just completed and they were excited to be a part of something really big. From the beginning, their musical styles were very different from Evanescence. I think to a degree they got bored or frustrated. They weren't part of the creative process and were like, 'Why are we doing this?' ... I have to do what's best for the band", she explained. "I've had a little bit of contact with John since and it was positive." In 2010, LeCompt said of his time in the band, "[Evanescence] was so big and important to my career and my life so I look back on it with fondness. We left the band but that doesn't say anything about my time in that band."

On May 17, 2007, former Dark New Day members, drummer Will Hunt and guitarist Troy McLawhorn were announced to have joined Evanescence on tour, replacing Gray and LeCompt. Lee and Balsamo said that the addition of Hunt and McLawhorn was good for the band, as they're easy to get along with, have similar tastes, are passionate players, have good energy on stage, and enjoy being in the band. The band finished their European tour with a sell-out concert at the Amphi in Ra'anana, Israel, on June 26, 2007. After the European tour, they co-headlined Korn's Family Values Tour 2007 in the US, and followed it with a headlining tour in the US. After the end of the album's tour, Lee took a break to recollect herself and live life away from the industry. By October 2011, The Open Door had sold six million copies worldwide.

2009–2014: Evanescence and hiatus

About 18 months after Lee stepped away from the industry, she began writing music again, and went into the studio with producer Steve Lillywhite. In a news posting to the Evanescence website during June 2009, Lee wrote that the band was in the process of writing new material for a new album proposed for release in 2010. The band played a "secret show" at the Manhattan Center Grand Ballroom in New York City on November 4, 2009, with label mates Civil Twilight. Tickets for the show sold out in five minutes. This show acted as a warm-up for their headline appearance at the Maquinária Festival in São Paulo, Brazil, which took place on November 8.

In January 2010, Evanescence released "Together Again" as a digital download, a song created for The Open Door but later cut. The song was released to aid the United Nations Foundation in Haiti earthquake recovery efforts. It later received an official release as a digital download on February 23, 2010.

Evanescence entered the studio on February 22, 2010, to begin recording for the new album, with Will "Science" Hunt assisting in programming. David Campbell, who previously worked on The Open Door, was brought back to handle string arrangements, and the album was initially being produced by Lillywhite. Lee later said that "Steve wasn't the right fit" and was replaced by producer Nick Raskulinecz. It was later revealed that the record label had scrapped the material recorded with Lillywhite.

At the time the band began recording, the album was intended for an August or September 2010 release. However, on June 21, 2010, Lee announced on EvThreads.com that Evanescence had temporarily left the studio to work further on the album and "get our heads into the right creative space". Lee also indicated that record label Wind-up Records was going through "uncertain times", which would further delay the release of the album. The band reentered the studio in early April 2011 with Raskulinecz, who had produced music for Alice in Chains, Deftones, and Foo Fighters, to continue work on the third album. It was reported that the album would be released in late 2011.

On June 12, 2011, Lee announced through her Twitter account that guitarist Troy McLawhorn, who worked with Seether for a time and left, was officially back with Evanescence, and the release date for their new album would be October 4, 2011. Later, on July 11, 2011, it was reported by MTV News that the release date for the album had been pushed back to October 11, and that the first single from the album will be "What You Want". The band recorded the album at Blackbird Studio, Nashville. During an interview with Kerrang!, Lee revealed that the new album's title will be Evanescence. Lee said that the decision for the title of the album was her love towards Evanescence, as well as the record being composed more collaboratively than past albums, with all members contributing. The record is "about the band", Lee explained. Its lyrical themes include Lee "falling back in love" with Evanescence, her being inspired by nature and the ocean, brokenness, the quest for freedom, and falling in love. Different from The Open Door, which was "all about me and my personal experiences", Evanescence also includes Lee's musings on events that occurred to others in her life. "But really, whatever makes me feel the most, that's what's on the record, because that's what I need to get off my chest."

The Evanescence Tour began on August 17, 2011, with a show at War Memorial Auditorium in Nashville. The band then performed at Rock on the Range in Winnipeg on August 20, 2011, and at Rock in Rio on October 2 alongside Guns N' Roses and System of a Down as well as Brazilian artists Pitty and Detonautas Roque Clube. After a series of events in North America, Evanescence traveled to Europe in November to play a sold-out tour in the UK, Germany and France, with support from The Pretty Reckless and Australian band ME. Evanescence performed at the Nobel Peace Prize Concert on December 11, 2011, where they played "Lost in Paradise" and "Bring Me to Life", before again touring in North America. In February 2012 they toured Japan with Dazzle Vision, and in the same month performed in other southeast Asian countries. March 2012 saw the band tour Australia and New Zealand with Blaqk Audio. Between April and July 2012, Evanescence toured in Europe and North America, with additional stops in Africa and the Middle East.

Evanescence took part in the Carnival of Madness Tour alongside Halestorm, Cavo, New Medicine, and Chevelle. The tour began on July 31, 2012, in Springfield, Illinois, and ran through September 2, 2012, ending in Buffalo. The Evanescence Tour resumed in October 2012 with stops in South America, Costa Rica, and Panama. The tour wrapped with a series of shows in England, ending on November 9, 2012, in London's Wembley Arena. Lee stated the band planned to take an extended break after the tour, saying, "At the end of any really long tour you need to get your head in order. I think at the end of the run we'll go on a break for a while and figure things out."

In October 2013, Wind-up Records sold part of their catalog of artists, including Evanescence and their master recordings, to Bicycle Music Company. The combined company Concord Bicycle Music will market the catalog. On January 3, 2014, it was announced that Amy Lee had filed a lawsuit against former record label Wind-up Records, seeking $1.5 million in unpaid royalties owed to the band. In March 2014, via her Twitter account, Lee announced that she and Evanescence had been released from their record label and were independent artists.

2015–2018: Return and Synthesis

On April 27, 2015, it was announced that the band would perform at Japan's Ozzfest on November 21, 2015, as the second headline act. On August 7, 2015, Lee announced that long-time guitarist Terry Balsamo had departed the band. His position was filled by German guitarist Jen Majura, who was recommended by Testament's Alex Skolnick.

In an October 2015 interview, Lee stated that she was focusing on solo projects so there were no current plans for new Evanescence music yet, but the band would continue to tour through 2016. "It feels really good to have a lot of different things going on at once in the sense that I feel like I'm not just flexing one muscle", she said. The band made their return to the stage in November 2015, playing three US shows and performing at Ozzfest in Tokyo, Japan, marking their first live performances since their hiatus.

In February 2016, Lee said the band was working on the six-LP vinyl box set titled The Ultimate Collection, which includes all three studio albums, the previously unreleased 2000 demo CD Origin, the rarities compilation album Lost Whispers, a studio version of the tour intro "Lost Whispers", a studio recording of the song "Even In Death", alongside a 52-page casebound book with art, handwritten lyrics, photos and rarities. The box set was released in February 2017, and the compilation album Lost Whispers was made available for streaming and downloading on Spotify, iTunes, and Anghami. It contains the re-recorded "Even in Death", previously released B-sides, the four deluxe edition bonus tracks to Evanescence, and the new song "Lost Whispers".

In the fall of 2016, the band toured select cities in the United States, choosing alternative rock band Veridia as their opener. During this tour, the band played a new song titled "Take Cover", an outtake from the scrapped 2010 sessions for their self-titled album. In an October 2016 interview with Loudwire, Lee confirmed that "there is Evanescence in the future", adding that she wants to take things step by step. She said in another interview that the band was not making a new album yet but working on a project that was "not exactly the most traditional thing", something that would take fans on a "different path that we wanna try". In February 2017, it was confirmed that the band was working in the studio.

On March 20, 2017, Lee spoke to AOL Build about her solo single, "Speak to Me"; during the interview, she spoke of "a new album" in the works by Evanescence, saying "We're working on something. [...] It's not just a straightforward 'next Evanescence album'," implying a stylistic change. In a March 23 interview with Metal Hammer, Lee stated that "It's something unique, something complex, something a little bit beyond that – and it's definitely new territory for all of us." The album was intended for release later in 2017.

In a Facebook post, Lee revealed that the new album is titled Synthesis. It is an orchestral and electronica piece, with selected songs from the band's previous albums rebuilt into classical arrangements reminiscent of a soundtrack, Lee said. Synthesis contains two new original songs: "Hi-Lo" featuring violinist Lindsey Stirling, and "Imperfection". The first recording session for Synthesis took place on May 23, 2017, and a remake of "Bring Me To Life" was released as a single on August 18. On August 15, the band announced that recording Synthesis was in its final stages. Evanescence toured with a full orchestra in late 2017 in support of the album, and tickets were sold starting on August 18. The band later toured across the US, Australia and Europe. Each ticket purchased came with a digital copy of Synthesis after its release. On September 14, 2017, the single "Imperfection" was officially released.

In March 2018, Evanescence announced that Lindsey Stirling would be joining the second North American leg as part of Evanescence's Synthesis Tour. While their focus would remain on touring, Lee stated during a July 2018 interview on WRIF that the band would begin working on their next studio album.

2019–present: The Bitter Truth

On February 4, 2019, the band released dates and locations for a spring/summer 2019 US concert tour. In May 2019, former guitarist Terry Balsamo performed with the band again at a live show for the song "Sweet Sacrifice". On May 11, 2019, Lee was quoted by Blabbermouth on plans for Evanescence to release a new studio album in 2020. In a November 21, 2019, Reddit AMA, Lee said of the album, "It's dark and heavy. Its also got moments of weird and sparse. Little bit of everything. Definitely some Open Door vibes but not the same."

On September 17, 2019, Evanescence and symphonic metal band Within Temptation announced a seven-city joint European tour titled Worlds Collide originally scheduled for April 2020. However, due to the COVID-19 pandemic, the tour was postponed for September 2020. It was then pushed back a second time to take place in September 2021. The tour had to be rescheduled a third time, with March 2022 set as the start date. The last postponement was announced in February 2022, with the tour scheduled for November and December 2022.

On September 5, 2019, Xbox released a launch trailer for the video game Gears 5 that included a cover of Fleetwood Mac's "The Chain", with vocals credited to Lee. A full version of the song was released by Evanescence on November 22, 2019, and features backing vocals by the other members of the band. A music video for the song was released on January 9, 2020. The cover song will not be included on the band's upcoming fifth album.

At the end of January 2020, the band entered the studio with Nick Raskulinecz, who produced their 2011 self-titled album, to work on three "heavy" songs. They would originally record only two songs with him, but ended up recording four. They planned to work with different producers each time they hit the studio to ensure a diverse sound, but this plan was set aside because of the COVID-19 pandemic.

On April 17, 2020, the band announced the title of their new album, The Bitter Truth, along with the artwork. The album's first single, "Wasted on You", was released on April 24 along with a music video. The music video was directed by P. R. Brown and included shots of the band members, at home due to the pandemic. The second single, "The Game Is Over", was released on July 1. "Use My Voice", the album's third single, was released on August 14. It features vocal contributions from Lzzy Hale, Taylor Momsen, and Sharon den Adel, and was used in a HeadCount campaign to encourage Americans to vote in the United States presidential election.

On December 4, 2020, it was announced the album would be released on March 26, 2021, and contain 12 tracks, including Evanescence outtake "Take Cover". Along with the album's pre-order, the fourth single, "Yeah Right", was released as an instant grab. On March 5, 2021, the band released the fifth single, "Better Without You". The song touches upon Lee's struggle in the music industry. Lee said in a Kerrang! cover story that she considers The Bitter Truth their fourth album, and not 2017's Synthesis, though it is the fifth album overall.

Evanescence and Halestorm's US tour was announced in May 2021 for the fall. The tour began on November 5, 2021, with the last city stop set for December 18, 2021. More dates were added in September 2021. In December 2021, the last five shows were rescheduled due to COVID-19 cases within the band's touring camp, with the tour completed in January 2022. Evanescence was voted by Revolver readers one of the top five live bands of 2021, with Revolver stating that The Bitter Truth "wasn't just a return for Evanescence — it was a rebirth."

In February 2022, "Bring Me to Life"'s music video surpassed 1 billion views on YouTube. In May 2022, the band announced that it parted ways with guitarist Jen Majura, and longtime bassist Tim McCord would switch to guitar while Emma Anzai of Sick Puppies would join as their new bassist. On July 15, 2022, Evanescence headlined the Rock Fest festival.

Evanescence and Korn co-headlined an 18-dates US summer tour from August 16 to September 16, 2022. The band also played Rocklahoma festival in early September, and the Aftershock Festival in Sacramento, California the following month. After four rescheduled attempts since 2019, Evanescence's co-headlining Worlds Collide European tour with Within Temptation began on November 9, 2022, running until December 8, 2022.

Evanescence is joining Muse on their North American tour from February to April 2023. They will perform at the new Sick New World festival on May 13, 2023 in Las Vegas, and Welcome to Rockville festival on May 19 in Florida. The band will also play the German festivals Rock am Ring and Rock im Park from June 2–4, 2023, Download Festival's 20th anniversary in England on June 9, Japan's Summer Sonic Festival on August 19-20, and Blue Ridge Rock Festival taking place September 7-10.

According to Loudwire in August 2022, Evanescence have sold a total of 31.9 million albums, making the band one of the best selling hard rock and metal artists of all time.

Artistry

Musical style
Evanescence blends various musical styles in their music, including rock, classical music, alternative music, heavy metal, industrial music, and electronica. Music journalists vary in terming Evanescence a rock or metal band, but many identify them as some form of gothic band. The band is generally classified as alternative metal, gothic rock, gothic metal, hard rock, and nu metal. Other genres used to describe Evanescence's sound over the years include industrial rock, symphonic metal, and symphonic rock.

Metal Injection deemed them "gothic-tinged alternative metal mainstays", and AllMusic described their music as "alt-metal that layers orchestral and electronic touches atop brooding goth rock". Regarding the early classification of Evanescence as nu-metal, Loudwire said that this occurred due to their debut album being released at a time "when nu-metal was essentially at its peak" and they "were one of the only bands fronted by a woman that was headlining massive rock and metal festivals with Korn and the like, so putting them in the same category was likely appropriate", while their music also had "nu-metal elements in addition to gothic metal". Kerrang! characterized the band's sound as a "melodic crush of haunting, baroque harmonies and heavy guitars".

The Washington Post Richard Harrington said in 2006 that Lee working with any group of musicians in the band "is going to sound like Evanescence -- dark, stormy, anguished, seeking both release and transcendence." Evanescence "has long had dual personalities, mixing alt-metal and symphonic rock on its three studio albums", while their fourth, Synthesis, focuses on "orchestral grandeur" with electronic percussion, The Wall Street Journal stated. The St. Louis Post-Dispatch wrote, "Evanescence has long been known to mix beauty and bombast", with Synthesis and its live orchestra-backed show turning Lee's "wrenching, introspective songs into neo-operatic anthems". AllMusic's Stephen Thomas Erlewine wrote of Evanescence's musical evolution: "Over the years and through multiple lineup shifts, the band persevered under Lee's helm, eventually shifting from the radio-friendly anthems of their early days into a shimmering, classically inspired symphonic alternative outfit in the 2010s".

Influences
Lee's musical influences throughout childhood and her teenage years included classical music, Danny Elfman's film scores, alternative music, grunge, hard rock, industrial music, death metal, groove metal, and electronica artists like Bjork and Portishead. Her earliest memory of wanting to fuse various and contrasting musical styles, was when she was training in classical piano and realized that a section of a composition from Baroque composer Bach resembled heavy metal.

With Evanescence, Lee aimed to combine her various musical tastes, "bringing something from the cinematic and classical symphonic world and marrying it to metal, hard rock and alternative music". "There was all this music that was inspiring me. And Evanescence was the product of these two extremes combining". Lee said in 2010 that alongside rock and metal, the band has "always had programming and inspirations from Bjork, Depeche Mode and Massive Attack and that kind of thing". Lee considers the Lacrimosa movement of Mozart's Requiem her favorite piece of music, and wove it into The Open Door song "Lacrymosa".

Evanescence cite Soundgarden, Björk, Mozart, Danny Elfman, Korn, Tori Amos, Nirvana, Pantera, Portishead, Massive Attack, Nine Inch Nails, Smashing Pumpkins, Garbage, Depeche Mode, and Joan Jett as influences.

Impact
Various publications have noted Evanescence's musical and gendered impact in rock. The band's symphonic gothic rock style was not present in the mainstream music industry, and their success among "testosterone-driven and male-dominated" rock radio was a rarity. Evanescence was an "anomaly" breaking into the mainstream, and played a "large part in mainstream-rock radio opening its mind to playing a female voice on the airwaves", Consequence wrote. Rolling Stone said Evanescence "brought theatrics and a much-needed femininity to the hard-rock boys' club of the early 2000s". Lee "broke down the doors of the alternative metal boys club", AllMusic stated, and was a "disrupter" of the early 2000s mainstream music scene. The Daily Telegraph noted that "the people who doubted that pianos or female vocals belonged in rock music were quickly proven wrong" with Evanescence albums' success and Lee's "singular voice in a scene dominated by macho aggression". Evanescence had a "big" impact "on the next generation of bands", Kerrang! wrote, and Lee "has helped light the path for many dauntless young women in music", The Los Angeles Times stated. Kerrang! named Evanescence "one of heavy music's most important, influential and relevant bands", and remarked that there is "a timelessness about their sound that's barely dated over the last two decades" and their "emotional potency has only been enhanced".

Band members
Current members
 Amy Lee – lead vocals, piano, keyboards, harp (1995–present)
 Tim McCord – guitar (2022–present); bass (2006–2022)
 Will Hunt – drums (2007–present)
 Troy McLawhorn – guitar (2007–present)
 Emma Anzai – bass, backing vocals (2022–present; touring musician)

Former members
 Ben Moody – guitar, drums (1995–2003)
 David Hodges – keyboards, backing vocals (1999–2002)
 Will Boyd – bass (2005–2006; touring musician 2003–2005)
 Rocky Gray – drums (2005–2007; touring musician 2003–2005)
 John LeCompt – guitar (2005–2007; touring musician 2003–2005)
 Terry Balsamo – guitar (2003–2015)
 Jen Majura – guitar, backing vocals, theremin (2017–2022; touring musician 2015–2017)

Timeline

Discography

Fallen (2003)
The Open Door (2006)
Evanescence (2011)
Synthesis (2017)
The Bitter Truth (2021)

Bibliography

Echoes from the Void - #1-5 (script: Carrie Lee South and Blake Northcott, illustrator: Abigail Larson and Kelly McKernan, letterer: Jacob Bascle, editor: Llexi Leon; Heavy Metal, 2021)

Awards and nominations

Evanescence's accolades include two Grammy Awards out of seven nominations, three Loudwire Music Awards, a Kerrang! Award, a Revolver Golden Gods Awards, a Brit Award nomination, three American Music Award nominations, and five MTV Video Music Award nominations.

References

External links

 
 

 
Musical groups established in 1995
American gothic metal musical groups
American gothic rock groups
American hard rock musical groups
American alternative metal musical groups
American nu metal musical groups
Heavy metal musical groups from Arkansas
Alternative rock groups from Arkansas
Grammy Award winners
Kerrang! Awards winners
World Music Awards winners
Musical quintets
Epic Records artists
Wind-up Records artists
Musical groups from Little Rock, Arkansas
Female-fronted musical groups